The First Baptist Church at in Phoenix, Arizona, was built in 1929. While local architects Fitzhugh & Byron "prepared the working drawings and supervised the building's construction," it was mainly designed by supervising architect George Merrill "of the Department of Architecture of the American Baptist Home Mission Society in New York."

It was designed in an Italian Gothic style, but includes Moderne and other architectural elements.

First Baptist Church moved to a new location in 1968.

References

External links

Churches in Phoenix, Arizona
Baptist churches in Arizona
Churches completed in 1929
National Register of Historic Places in Phoenix, Arizona
Churches on the National Register of Historic Places in Arizona
Gothic Revival architecture in Arizona